147 km is a rural locality (a settlement) in Sanbolinskoye Rural Settlement of Amursky District, Russia. The population was 9 .

Geography 
The settlement is located on the Volochaevka II - Komsomolsk-on-Amur railway line between the stations of Sanboli and Nuskha.

Streets 
 Vokzalnaya

References 

Rural localities in Khabarovsk Krai